The Tacoma Narrows (or the Narrows), a strait, is part of Puget Sound in the U.S. state of Washington. A navigable maritime waterway between glacial landforms, the Narrows separates the Kitsap Peninsula from the city of Tacoma.

The Narrows is spanned by the twin Tacoma Narrows Bridges (State Route 16). An earlier bridge collapsed shortly after it opened.

In 1841 Charles Wilkes, during the United States Exploring Expedition, named the strait simply Narrows. Its name was formally set as The Narrows by Henry Kellett during the British Admiralty chart reorganization of 1847.

References

Bodies of water of Pierce County, Washington
Straits of Washington (state)
Landforms of Puget Sound